Richard J. White (1827October 8, 1895) was an Irish American immigrant, farmer, and Democratic politician.  He served one term in the Wisconsin State Assembly, representing southern Milwaukee County.

Biography
Richard White was born in Ireland in 1827.  He emigrated to the United States and came to reside on a farm in Oak Creek, Wisconsin Territory, around 1841.  He became involved with the Democratic Party.  In 1857, he was an unsuccessful candidate for Wisconsin State Assembly, losing to Republican Orlando Ellsworth.  He ran again in 1864, and this time was elected to the 1865 session.  In the Assembly, he served on the committee on local legislation.  In the 1870s, White moved with his family to Algoma, Wisconsin.

Family
His son, also named Richard J. White, served as United States Marshal in Milwaukee from 1923 until his death in July 1928.

Another son, William, served as postmaster at Algoma from 1897 until his death in 1927.

References

External links
 

1827 births
1895 deaths
Irish emigrants to the United States
People from Oak Creek, Wisconsin
Democratic Party members of the Wisconsin State Assembly